is a 1972 Japanese tokusatsu kaiju film directed and written by Toshihiro Iijima, with special effects by Jun Oki and Minoru Nakano. Co-produced by Tsuburaya Productions and Toho Studios, the film stars Hiroshi Inuzuka and Akiji Kobayashi.

Plot
Daigoro is a monster who was orphaned after the military used intercontinental missiles to kill his mother while she tried to protect him. Only one man stood against that decision. He pitied the infant, and took it as his own and raised him in Japan. But Daigoro grew too large and too expensive to feed. The man made Daigoro an icon for a business. Elsewhere Goliath, a monster who had been trapped in an asteroid for a long time, went to Earth and battled Daigoro. Goliath eventually defeated Daigoro by striking him with lightning from his horn. Goliath then left to pillage the world, leaving Daigoro to die. Daigoro recovered and practiced daily for his next battle against Goliath. After an intense fight, Daigoro breathed his fire ray and managed to defeat Goliath. The humans then grabbed Goliath while he was still weak and strapped him to a rocket and launched him into space.

Cast 
 Shinsuke Minami as Goro Kizawa
 Kazuya Kosaka as Saito
 Hachiro Misumi as Goro Hachi
 Akiji Kobayashi as Hitoshi Suzuki}
 Hiroshi Inuzuka as Ojisan

Release
Daigoro vs. Goliath was released in Japan on 17 December 1972 where it was distributed by Toho.

References

Footnotes

Sources

External links

1972 films
1970s monster movies
Films directed by Toshihiro Iijima
1970s Japanese-language films
Kaiju films
Tsuburaya Productions
Toho films
Films about mother–son relationships
1970s Japanese films